Caroline of Great Britain may refer to:

 Caroline of Ansbach (1683–1737), Queen of Great Britain and Ireland, Electress of Hanover
 Princess Caroline of Great Britain (1713–1757)
 Caroline Matilda of Great Britain (1751–1775), Queen of Denmark and Norway
 Caroline of Brunswick (1768–1821), Queen of the United Kingdom and Hanover